The Geary Street, Park and Ocean Railway was a street railway in San Francisco.

History
The company received a franchise from the city to operate a cable railway on November 6, 1878. Operations commenced on February 16, 1880 as a Russian gauge tram pulled by steam dummy locomotives. The route soon proved quite popular. The line was purchased by the Market Street Railway in 1887; operations were not consolidated as Market Street Railway did not own all of the outstanding stock in the Geary Street railway.

The company's operating franchise expired in November 1903, but it continued to operate and pay its fees to the city. Following the 1906 San Francisco earthquake, cars had actually operated in the few hours immediately following the tremor but were stopped until June due to damage at the power house. The company's operating permit was restored in 1907. In 1912, the city declined to renew the franchise and instead took over the right of way. The last day of cable operations by the Geary Street, Park and Ocean Railway was on May 5, 1912. The line was rebuilt into an electric streetcar line, forming the first element of the San Francisco Municipal Railway (Muni) that was to become synonymous with transit in that city.

Muni replaced the street cars with motor coaches in 1956. Today, the bus routes that serve the Geary corridor are the most heavily used in San Francisco.

Infrastructure
Cars terminated downtown at Geary, Market, and Kearny Streets. The powerhouse was in a two-story wooden building on the northwest corner of Geary Boulevard and Buchanan Street. The car barn was in a building on the northwest corner of Geary Boulevard and Arguello Boulevard, later an Office Max store.

Rolling stock
Baldwin Locomotive Works built four 0-4-0 tank locomotives for the line. Numbers 1 and 3 (C/N 4801 & 4817) had vertical boilers while numbers 2 and 4 (C/N 4827 & 5115) had more conventional horizontal boilers. The two locomotives with horizontal boilers were sold to redwood logging railroads when line was converted to cable car operation on August 7, 1892. Locomotive #2 became #6 for Hobbs, Wall & Company of Crescent City, California; and #4 was sent to the Glen Blair Redwood Company on the California Western Railroad.

See also 
38 Geary
San Francisco cable car system
List of defunct San Francisco Municipal Railway lines

References

Bibliography

Public transportation in San Francisco
Streetcars in California
Tram, urban railway and trolley companies
Cable car railways in the United States
Defunct public transport operators in the United States
Defunct California railroads
5 ft gauge railways in the United States
1880 establishments in California
1912 disestablishments in California